Livezile (literally "orchards"; until 1968 Tolvădia; ;) is a commune in Timiș County, Romania. It is composed of two villages, Dolaț and Livezile (commune seat). From 1972 to 2006, its villages were part of Banloc commune.

Geography 
Livezile is located in the southwestern part of Timiș County, along the border with Serbia, in the Timiș Plain. The Timiș Plain is a recent plain, mostly a floodplain, drained by Bega and Timiș rivers with their tributaries and arms. Until its draining and damming, the plain was almost entirely a swamp.

It borders Banloc to the east and Giera to the west. To the north, the commune's border is located on the Lanca Birda, a left tributary of the Timiș River, which separates it from Ghilad. To the south, the commune's border is located on the Bârzava River, which on a stretch of 3.8 km marks Romania's border with Serbia. Between these limits, the commune has an area of 55.8 km2.

Climate 
Due to its geographical location, Livezile's climate is temperate continental with a pronounced forest-steppe character, with relatively mild winters and long springs and autumns. The average annual temperature is 10.9 °C. The distribution of rainfall during the year is quite irregular, with minimal monthly rainfall in October and November. The wind regime is varied. From autumn to spring, under the influence of the Siberian High, cold north winds blow, and during the summer dry south winds. Heavy rains come from the west, and hail from the east and northeast.

History 

The first recorded mention of Livezile dates from 1332. The old name of the village is Tolvădia, derived from the German Tolwad. In the Middle Ages it belonged to Temes County, and around 1462 it was the property of Bergsoy Hagymás of Berecks (Beregsău). At the 1717 census, carried out shortly after the expulsion of the Turks from Banat, Tolvădia had 30 houses and belonged to Ciacova District. Ecclesiastically, Tolvădia was a branch of the Catholic parish of Ofsenița in the 19th century.

Between 1918–1922, Tolvădia belonged to Plasa Modoș, between 1922–1958 to Plasa Ciacova, then it was part of Deta District, until 1968. After the administrative-territorial reform of 1968, Tolvădia was renamed Livezile and, together with Dolaț, incorporated into the commune of Banloc. In 2006 the commune of Livezile was re-established on Law no. 461/2006, splitting off from the commune of Banloc.

Demographics 

Livezile had a population of 1,566 inhabitants at the 2011 census, down 4% from the 2002 census. Most inhabitants are Romanians (88.25%), larger minorities being represented by Hungarians (3.9%), Germans (2.55%) and Serbs (1.47%). For 2.81% of the population, ethnicity is unknown. By religion, most inhabitants are Orthodox (83.01%), but there are also minorities of Roman Catholics (9.9%), Serbian Orthodox (1.47%) and Pentecostals (1.4%). For 3% of the population, religious affiliation is unknown.

References 

Communes in Timiș County
Localities in Romanian Banat